This is a list of notable artists from, or associated with, Algeria.

A
 Abderrahmane Abdelli (born 1958)
 Adel Abdessemed (born 1971)

B
 Baya (1931–1998)
 Souhila Belbahar (born 1934)
 Nadia Benbouta (born 1970)
 Zohra Bensemra (born 1968)
 Ahmed Benyahia (born 1943)
 Racim Benyahia (born 1987)
 Samta Benyahia (born 1950)
 Zaida Ben-Yusuf (1869–1933)
 Zoulikha Bouabdellah (born 1977)
 Boualem Boukacem (born 1957)
 Mohamed Boumerdassi (1936–2010)

F
 Omar Fetmouche (born 1955)

H
 Abdelkhader Houamel (1936–2018)

I
 M'hamed Issiakhem (1928–1985)

K
 Mohammed Khadda (1930–1991)
 Rachid Koraïchi (born 1947)

M
 Cherif Merzouki (1951–1991)
 Rachid Mouffouk (born 1955)

N
 Houria Niati (born 1948)

O
 Driss Ouadahi (born 1959)

R
 Mohammed Racim (1896–1975)
 Omar Racim (1884–1959)

T
 Mohamed Temam (1915–1988)

Y
 Bachir Yellès (1921–2022)

Z
 Rezki Zerarti (born 1938)
 Hocine Ziani (born 1953)
 Amina Zoubir (born 1983)

References 

 
Algeria
Artists